Sian Heder (born June 23, 1977) is an American television writer, television producer, and filmmaker who is best known for writing and directing the films Tallulah and CODA. CODA earned Heder an Academy Award for Best Adapted Screenplay, while the film won for Best Picture.

Early life
Heder was born in Cambridge, Massachusetts, on June 23, 1977, the daughter of Welsh artist Mags Harries and Hungarian artist Lajos Héder. Her sister, Thyra, is also an artist. Ben Affleck's mother, Chris Boldt, was one of Heder's sixth-grade teachers. Heder graduated with a BFA from the Carnegie Mellon School of Drama.

Career 
After graduation, Heder moved to Los Angeles to become an actress and screenwriter while working for a nanny agency. At the agency, she worked for guests with children staying at four-star hotels and her experiences inspired Mother, her first short film as writer and director. In early 2005, the script for Mother was one of eight chosen to be awarded a fellowship for the prestigious American Film Institute's DWW (Directing Workshop for Women). Mother won the Grand Jury Award for "Best Narrative Short" at the Florida Film Festival, and also received honors at the Cinéfondation Competition of the Cannes Film Festival and the Seattle International Film Festival. The film was then selected to appear in competition at Palm Springs International Festival of Shorts and the British Film Institute's London Film Festival.

In 2010, Heder won a Peabody Award, along with her fellow writers, for her work on the acclaimed U.S. television series, Men of a Certain Age. In 2011 she wrote and directed a short comedy, Dog Eat Dog (A Short Tale) starring Zachary Quinto to raise awareness for pet adoption, and that short film can be watched for free on YouTube. She wrote for seasons 1-3 of the Netflix original series Orange Is the New Black before taking time off from that job to direct the film Tallulah.

In 2015, Heder directed Tallulah, starring Elliot Page and Allison Janney. Tallulah was backed by Route One Entertainment, Maiden Voyages Pictures and Ocean Blue Entertainment. The film was set to premier as one of 65 films selected for Sundance Film Festival January 21–31 in Utah. Netflix obtained worldwide rights to stream Tallulah in January 2016. The film received positive reviews from critics, and was released on July 29, 2016.

In 2021, Heder's film CODA premiered at the Sundance Film Festival. After signing a deal with Apple, the rights to the film were bought for $25 million. Heder won the Academy Award for Best Adapted Screenplay and the BAFTA Award for Best Adapted Screenplay for her work on the film.

Personal life
Heder is married to actor and producer David Newsom, with whom she has two children.

Filmography

See also
 List of female film and television directors
 List of LGBT-related films directed by women

References

External links
 

1977 births
Living people
American women writers
Carnegie Mellon University College of Fine Arts alumni
American people of Welsh descent
American people of Hungarian descent
American women film directors
People from Cambridge, Massachusetts
Film directors from Massachusetts
Screenwriters from Massachusetts
Best Adapted Screenplay BAFTA Award winners
Sundance Film Festival award winners
Best Adapted Screenplay Academy Award winners